Bobo's Beat is an album by jazz percussionist Willie Bobo recorded in late 1962 and released on the Roulette label.

Reception

The AllMusic review by John Bush states "Bobo's Beat is a jazz fan's delight: great work from all the principles, and a steady sense of inter-relational talents sounding off in close harmony with each other".

Track listing
 "Bon Sueno" (Frank Colon) – 2:30
 "Naked City Theme" (Billy May) – 2:17
 "Felicidade" (Antonio Carlos Jobim, Vinícius de Moraes) – 3:28   
 "Bossa Nova in Blue" (Frank Anderson) – 2:44   
 "Boroquinho" (Roberto Menescal, Christopher Boscole) – 4:30   
 "Crisis" (Freddie Hubbard) – 5:15   
 "Mi Fas y Recordar" (Bill Salter) – 3:56   
 "Capers"  (Tom McIntosh) – 3:47   
 "Let Your Hair Down Blues" (Frank Anderson) – 5:13

Personnel
Willie Bobo – vocals, percussion, timbales
Clark Terry – trumpet 
Joe Farrell – tenor saxophone 
Frank Anderson – organ, piano

References

Roulette Records albums
Albums produced by Teddy Reig
Willie Bobo albums
1963 albums